Fabio Baggio CS (born 15 January 1965) is an Italian Catholic priest. Since 2017, he has served as one of the Vatican's officials in charge of migrants and refugees. He has spent his career as a missionary, including eight years in Latin America and eight years in the Philippines. He supports improved legal entrance for migrants and refugees.

Biography
Fabio Baggio was born on 15 January 1965 in Bassano del Grappa in the Italian province of Vicenza.  He joined the Scalabrian Missionaries in 1976, studied at their seminary in his native city, and took his perpetual vows in 1991. He was ordained a priest in 1992.

He earned a bachelor's degree in theology and then a licentiate and a doctorate in church history from the Pontifical Gregorian University in 1998. From 1995 to 1997, while a pastor in Santiago de Chile, he was councillor to the Migrations Commission of the Episcopal Conference of Chile. From 1997 to 2002 he was director of Migrations Department of the Archdiocese of Buenos Aires, taking on in 1999 additional responsibilities for evangelization on behalf of the Pontifical Missions of Argentina.

From 1999 to 2010 he taught at the Universidad del Salvador in Buenos Aires, the Institute of Theology of Sao Paulo, the University of Manila, and the Maryhill School of Theology in Quezon City, Philippines, where he was director of the Scalabrini Migration Center and of the Asian Pacific Migration Journal.

From 2000 to 2017 he taught at the Scalabrini International Migration Institute within the Faculty of Theology of the Pontifical Urbaniana University and in 2013 he became its dean and a full professor.

Beginning on 1 January 2017 he worked as one of the undersecretaries of the Migrants and Refugees Section of the Dicastery for Promoting Integral Human Development alongside Michael Czerny. On 26 August 2021, he was named one of three members of the Vatican's Covid-19 commission. On 23 April 2022, Pope Francis named him the sole undersecretary of his section and enlarged his responsibilities to include special projects.

In 2019 he described his section's message:

During a visit to Albania in July 2019 he said that interreligious dialogue could help resolve the ethical challenges posed by migration, that universal principles could be found within religions to develop a shared ethical response to the problems of social integration posed by population movements.

References

Additional sources

External links
 

Living people
1965 births
People from Bassano del Grappa
Pontifical Gregorian University alumni
Scalabrinians
Officials of the Roman Curia